Hastings Street is one of the most important east-west traffic corridors in the cities of Vancouver and Burnaby, British Columbia, Canada, and used to be a part of the decommissioned Highway 7A. In the central business district of Downtown Vancouver, it is known as West Hastings Street; at Carrall Street it becomes East Hastings Street and runs eastwards through East Vancouver and Burnaby. In Burnaby, there is no east-west designation.  The street ends in Westridge, a neighbourhood at the foot of Burnaby Mountain where it joins the recently built Burnaby Mountain Parkway and diverges from the continuation of the former Highway 7A as the Barnet Highway, to Port Moody, British Columbia.

Route description 
Formally named in 1885 for Rear-Admiral George Fowler Hastings of the Royal Navy, the street runs past such well-known Vancouver landmarks as the Marine Building, the Vancouver Club, Sinclair Centre, Harbour Centre (once Spencer's, Eaton's, then Sears and now the downtown campus of Simon Fraser University), Dominion Building and Victory Square (the location of the city's original courthouse) and the Woodward's Building; located in the old Dunn's Tailors building at Homer and West Hastings is the campus of the Vancouver Film School, while on the corner of Cambie is the Carter-Cotton Building, the former headquarters of the Vancouver Province newspaper. East of Woodward's, the street forms the heart of Vancouver's historic original downtown, once known as the Great White Way because of its neon displays, and which is today the Downtown Eastside. Through the East End, after a stretch of warehouse-type commercial and wholesale businesses, the street forms one of the commercial cores for Vancouver's Italian community in a mixed-ethnicity retail area in the area of Nanaimo Street, just east of which the Pacific National Exhibition and Playland are on the city of Vancouver's eastern fringe.  After leaving Vancouver, Hastings forms the core of a Burnaby retail neighbourhood known as the Heights  and then traverses Capitol Hill to the Lochdale and Westridge areas.

Major intersections 
From west to east.

Photos

External links

References

Streets in Vancouver
Roads in Burnaby
Transport in Greater Vancouver